The Strain is an American vampire horror media franchise created by Guillermo del Toro and Chuck Hogan.

Del Toro first envisioned the story line as a television series, but was unable to find a broadcaster who was interested. A friend then suggested turning the story into a series of books with writer Chuck Hogan.

A television adaptation premiered on FX in 2014, concluding in 2017 after 46 episodes.

Novels 
Co-written by Guillermo del Toro and Chuck Hogan. Published by William Morrow and Company.

Comic books 
Published by Dark Horse Comics.

The Strain (2011–2013) 
The Strain is a limited comic book series written David Lapham, with artist Mike Huddleston. It was adapted from the novel of the same name. The first issue received positive reviews.

The Fall (2013–14) 
The Strain: The Fall was written by David Lapham, with artist Mike Huddleston. It was adapted from the novel of the same name.

The Night Eternal (2014–15) 
The Strain: The Night Eternal was written David Lapham, with artist Mike Huddleston. It was adapted from a novel of the same name.

Hardcover collections (2014–16) 
Collections of each series in a hardcover format. Limited number of printings are cloth-bound.

Mister Quinlan (2016–17) 
The Strain: Mister QuinlanVampire Hunter is a limited series explores the origins of the half-vampire, Quintus Sertorius, whose name was later Gallicised to Quinlan. Written David Lapham, with artist Edgar Salazar

Television series 

In 2012 it was announced that FX had ordered a pilot episode of The Strain with the intention of creating a limited television series based on the books. Before writing the book trilogy, del Toro had initially planned the books as a television series and stated that if picked up, the series would span three to five seasons. He also commented that he and Hogan would co-write the script for the pilot episode and that as of November 2012 he had already begun casting. Del Toro further commented that he planned to also direct the pilot episode, with a full season airing in 2014 if the show was picked up.

It was later announced that a second full season was ordered by FX to air in 2015. Following the fourth episode of season 2, FX renewed the series for a third season, after which the creators announced they hope it will last for a total of 5 seasons. A fourth and final season was announced by FX on September 27, 2016 and it set for a Summer 2017 date.

References

External links 
 

Television franchises